Megalofrea humeralis is a species of beetle in the family Cerambycidae. It was described by Vollehoven in 1869. It is known from Madagascar.

Varietas
 Megalofrea humeralis var. attenuata (Fairmaire, 1896)
 Megalofrea humeralis var. distincta (Fairmaire, 1871)
 Megalofrea humeralis var. rufonubila (Fairmaire, 1896)
 Megalofrea humeralis var. tenuepunctata (Fairmaire, 1902)

References

Crossotini
Beetles described in 1869